This is an incomplete list of all military confrontations that have occurred within the boundaries of the modern U.S. State of Indiana since European contact. The French first entered Indiana c. 1670. The region was part of New France from 1679–1763, ruled by Great Britain from 1763–1783, and part of the United States of America 1783–present.

There have been several wars that have directly affected the region, including Beaver Wars (c 1590–1701), Queen Anne's War (1702–1713), King George's War (1744–1748), French and Indian War (1754–1763), American Revolutionary War (1775–1783), Northwest Indian War (1785–1795), Tecumseh's War (1811–1812), War of 1812 (1812–1814), and the American Civil War (1860–1865). Later wars, including World War I and World War II led to the death of tens of thousands of Hoosiers overseas, but the American Civil War was the last war in which an actual battle occurred within Indiana.

Battles

Notes

See also

History of Indiana
Indiana in the American Civil War

Indiana in the American Revolution

Indiana in the Northwest Indian War
Indiana in the American Civil War
Battles
Indiana
Battles in Indiana
Military history of Indiana